Prokopyevsk is a city in Kemerovo Oblast, Russia. Population:

History
It was founded in 1918 as the settlement of Prokopyevsky from the existing villages of Monastyrskoye and Prokopyevskoye, and was granted town status and renamed in 1931.

Administrative and municipal status

Within the framework of administrative divisions, Prokopyevsk serves as the administrative center of Prokopyevsky District, even though it is not a part of it. As an administrative division, it is incorporated separately as Prokopyevsk City Under Oblast Jurisdiction—an administrative unit with the status equal to that of the districts. As a municipal division, Prokopyevsk City Under Oblast Jurisdiction is incorporated as Prokopyevsky Urban Okrug.

Economy
Prokopyevsk is one of the main centers of the extraction of coking coal in the Kuznetsk Basin (Kuzbass).

References

Notes

Sources

Cities and towns in Kemerovo Oblast
Monotowns in Russia